Majjat is a town and rural commune in Chichaoua Province of the Marrakech-Tensift-Al Haouz region of Morocco . It belongs to the Ait Belaid Family . At the time of the 2004 census, the commune had a total population of 11,798 people living in 1,988 households.

References

Populated places in Chichaoua Province
Rural communes of Marrakesh-Safi